"One Night in Heaven" is a song by British band M People, released as their sixth overall single and the first single from their second album, Elegant Slumming (1993). Written by band members Mike Pickering and Paul Heard, it was released on 14 June 1993. The song was successful in Europe, peaking at number six on the UK Singles Chart. In Iceland, it reached number five, while peaking at number 26 on the Eurochart Hot 100. Its accompanying music video was filmed in Barcelona, Sitges and Montserrat in Spain.

Composition
The song was recorded at the Roundhouse in Chalk Farm, London. The key refrain "One Night in Heaven, One Night in Heaven" is sung by vocalist Juliet Roberts who sings backing vocals throughout.
The song is made up of a variety of key elements, most notably, the sequenced "brass bottle" synths at the intro and in the break. The melody line is guided by the moog bassline, programmed drumming and layered with high hat synths and a continuous beat. This is embodied by the progressive chords and additional chords during the choruses. In the chorus the song bears a startling resemblance to a Top 20 1975 hit song called 'Highwire' by Linda Carr and The Love Squad.

Chart performance
Like the previous single, "One Night in Heaven" became the second consecutive single to enter the top 10 and climb higher. It is the only M People single to climb not once, but twice. It spent the first three weeks climbing from its introductory chart position of number nine to seven to then peak in its third week at number six.
The single entered the chart at number nine in the summer of 1993 with sales of 84,000 copies in its first week, but after one of two performances on Top of the Pops made a steady ascent climbing to number seven selling further 89,000 copies in each of the following two weeks and in its fourth week selling 98,000 copies to climb and peak at number six where it remained for another week afterwards. This meant the single sold 360,000 copies in a month and spent a total of 11 weeks in the chart throughout the summer of 1993 leaving 30 August 1993.

"One in Night in Heaven" became a massive success Europe-wide, scoring a top 10 hit also in Iceland (5), and a top 20 hit in Belgium (19), Germany (15), Ireland (12), and Sweden (12). On the dance chart, M People were held off the top spot by Haddaway's "What Is Love". The song also reached No. 1 on the Billboard Hot Dance Club Play chart in the US in 1994.

Critical reception
Keith Farley from AllMusic described the song as "driving British house". Another editor, Jon O'Brien felt it is "still as joyously infectious as ever". Larry Flick from Billboard wrote that Heather Small "continues to shine as a unique and compelling frontwoman, while tunesmiths/musicians Mike Pickering and Paul Heard provide a track that combines disco, house, and Philly soul flavors." He added, "A club smash that is ripe for radio picking. Don't be left out." Ben Thompson from The Independent viewed it as "vibrant", adding that "contemporary pop-soul" does not get much better than this. In his weekly UK chart commentary, James Masterton noted that "this totally new track is if anything even more commercial [than "How Can I Love You More?"]". Pan-European magazine Music & Media stated that "the dance avant gardists have become more poppy than ever. With this heavily sequenced song on an "old fashioned" disco beat, these people are again probably light years ahead of their time." 

Alan Jones from Music Week deemed it a "pop/dance gem from Manchester's finest, with some particularly attractive wailing from Heather Small. It's immediate and highly commercial." Another editor, Andy Beevers, named it Pick of the Week in the category of Dance, describing it as "upbeat soul, driven by an inventive house mix", that "should make the mainstream charts". A reviewer from The Network Forty stated that it "picks up right where their first smash, "Moving On Up", left off. Huge in the UK, MPeople are beginning to spread their magic to the colonies." James Hamilton from the RM Dance Update complimented it as "gloriously catchy cantering" with a "Sixties soul chorus". Sam Taylor from The Observer called the song "joyous". Tom Doyle from Smash Hits felt it "proved M People are the finest exponents of the party garage sound." Jonathan Bernstein from Spin complimented Small's "smoky alto" and an "all-time great one-two sucker punch" of the "aptly titled" "One Night in Heaven".

Airplay
"One Night in Heaven" was serviced to radio four weeks before physical release on 19 May as the follow-up to previous airplay top 10 smash "How Can I Love You More (Mixes)". By the end of week one on airplay, the single had become the highest new entry being played 315 times on UK Radio placing it straight in at Number 58. All UK Independent Local Radio stations, BBC Radio 2 and even Radio 1 had added the song to their A-Lists. It became M People's first Airplay Chart number one in the UK where it remained for two weeks. It then took another eleven weeks to leave the Airplay Top 75 which meant it was still being heavily played when its successor "Moving on Up" was released to radio.

Music video
The accompanying music video for "One Night in Heaven" was filmed in Barcelona, Sitges and Montserrat at the end of April 1993 and filmed over two days. It was the first M People music video to be filmed abroad with a relatively larger budget. The premise was to introduce the band and show them singing along to the song and having fun. The band's three members Heather Small, Mike Pickering and Paul Heard and the band's percussionist Shovell (for the first time, who would later become full-time member) are all featured in various scenes within popular tourist spots including Park Güell and the Sagrada Família both designed by Antoni Gaudí.

"One Night in Heaven" was later published by Vevo on YouTube in October 2009, and had generated more than 3.2 million views as of December 2022.

Live performances
In its original live incarnation, "One Night in Heaven" gets arguably one of the largest rapturous audience response, than any other single. During the Elegant Slumming, Bizarre Fruit, Bizarre Fruit II tours as well as T in the Park and Glastonbury in 1994, it has been performed as the full-length album version towards the end of the second half their shows (pre-encore).
From 1996 onwards they have performed the song with the David Morales Classic Mix intro found on Elegantly American. Snake Davis also no longer plays flute during the choruses.

Remixes
Remixes of the single were provided by Harri and M People themselves created the Hi Gloss mixes. Further mixes of the single were created for the Elegantly American including mixes by David Morales.

Track listings

In the UK, the CD single does not contain the radio edit. At the time the radio edit was only made available on the 7" version of the single, whilst compilations featured a shorter 3.25 edit.

 CSS
 "One Night in Heaven" (7" Mix) – 3.44
 "One Night in Heaven" (Thee Def Radio Mix) – 3.56

 7" mini
 "One Night in Heaven" (Master Edit) – 3.44
 "One Night in Heaven" (Hi Gloss Dub) – 5.56

 12" maxi
 "One Night in Heaven" (Master Mix) – 6.32
 "One Night in Heaven" (Harri's Dub) – 7.54
 "One Night in Heaven" (Hi Gloss Mix) – 6.22
 "One Night in Heaven" (Hi Gloss Dub) – 5.56
 "One Night in Heaven" (Harri's Vocal) – 7.07

 CD maxi
 "One Night in Heaven" (Master Mix) – 6.32
 "One Night in Heaven" (Harri's Dub) – 7.54
 "One Night in Heaven" (Hi Gloss Mix) – 6.22
 "One Night in Heaven" (Hi Gloss Dub) – 5.56
 "One Night in Heaven" (Harri's Vocal) – 7.07

Charts

Weekly charts

Year-end charts

References

External links
 http://www.uk-charts.top-source.info/top-100-1993.shtml

See also
List of number-one dance hits (United States)

1993 singles
1993 songs
Dance-pop songs
Deconstruction Records singles
M People songs
Songs written by Mike Pickering
Songs written by Paul Heard